Tong may refer to:

Chinese 
Tang Dynasty, a dynasty in Chinese history when transliterated from Cantonese
Tong (organization), a type of social organization found in Chinese immigrant communities
tong, pronunciation of several Chinese characters
See:
The Chinese surnames Tang (唐 and 湯/汤) transliterated based on Cantonese
The Chinese surnames (佟, 童 and 仝) transliterated based on Mandarin

People 
Tong (surname), a Gan Chinese of Zhang, (张), (莊), Cantonese of Tang (滕), (鄧), Beijing Chinese of Tung (佟)
Tong Dizhou (1902–1979)
Tong Fei (born 1961)
Tong Guan (1054–1126)
Tong Jian (born 1979)
Amy Tong (born 1977), American judoka
Anote Tong (born 1952)
Bao Tong (born 1932), Director of the Office of Political Reform of the CPC Central Committee and the Policy Secretary of Zhao Ziyang
Grace Tong (born 1942)
Jacqueline Tong (born 1951)
Kaity Tong (born 1947)
Kelvin Tong
Kent Tong (born 1958)
Lim Goh Tong (1918–2007), Malaysian Chinese businessman
Ling Tong (189–237), military general of the state of Eastern Wu
Ly Tong (born 1945), Vietnamese American anti-communist activist
Michael Tong (born 1969)
Pete Tong (born 1960), dance music DJ and radio presenter
Rona Tong (1910–2006), New Zealand athlete
Ronny Tong (born 1950)
Shen Tong (born 1968), Chinese dissident
Simon Tong (born 1972), English musician and member of The Verve
Stanley Tong (born 1960)
Tong Yabgu, a 7th-century Turkish khagan
Vincent Tong (actor) (born 1980)
Tong Wen (born 1983)
Wang Tong (disambiguation)
William Tong (born c. 1970)
Yang Tong (605–619)
Yeo Cheow Tong (born 1947)

Places 
Tong, Shropshire, a village in Shropshire, England
Tong Castle, a large country house in Shropshire, demolished in 1954
Tong, West Yorkshire, a village in England
Tong (ward), an electoral division of the City of Bradford, West Yorkshire, England
Tong, Lewis, a village in the Outer Hebrides, Scotland
Tong, South Sudan, a town in Warrup State (also spelled Tonj)
Tong District, Issyk Kul Province, Kyrgyzstan

See also
 Tongs, a type of tool used to grip and lift objects
 Tongland (gang area), a name for the Calton area of Glasgow — named for a local gang, the Calton Tongs
 
 Tonge (disambiguation)